Her Majesty the Decemberists is the second full-length album by The Decemberists, released on September 9, 2003, by Kill Rock Stars. The song "Song for Myla Goldberg" was written years earlier, after Colin Meloy had been a media escort for the novelist Myla Goldberg during a tour following the publication of her first book, Bee Season.

The album cover was designed by the Portland artist Carson Ellis, the long-time girlfriend (later wife) of Meloy, who has created artwork for each of the band's albums.

As of November 2005 it had sold 40,000 copies in United States.

Track listing
All songs written by Colin Meloy.

Note: On some editions, the track listing printed on the actual disc omits "The Chimbley Sweep", though the song is listed on the back of the CD jacket and in the liner notes.

Personnel
According to the liner notes of Her Majesty the Decemberists.

The Decemberists
Colin Meloy – vocals, acoustic guitar, electric guitar, percussion
Chris Funk – electric guitar, Oberheim synthesizer, pedal steel, lap steel, dobro, percussion
Jenny Conlee – Hammond organ, piano, Rhodes piano, accordion, Wurlitzer, backing vocals, percussion
Jesse Emerson – electric bass, upright bass, percussion
Rachel Blumberg – drums, percussion, vibes, glockenspiel, backing vocals, organ solo on "Red Right Ankle"

Additional musicians
Cory Gray – trumpet, trombone, hand claps
Dave Lipkind – chromatic harmonica
Carson Ellis – Blood-curdling scream
Kenneth Erlick – Hand claps

Her Majesty's String Quartet

Bridget Callahan – viola
Mike Lah – cello
Lucia Atkinson – violin
Emily Cox – violin

Production
Produced by The Decemberists with Larry Crane and Adam Selzer
Engineered by Larry Crane (tracks 2–6, 8, 10) and Adam Selzer (tracks 1, 7, 9, 11)
Mastered by John Golden
String arrangements by Mike Johnson
Illustrations and design by Carson Ellis, assisted by Colin Meloy
Layout and production by Brady Clark

References

2003 albums
The Decemberists albums
Kill Rock Stars albums
Albums produced by Larry Crane (recording engineer)